Cégep de Saint-Hyacinthe is a CEGEP (College of General and Vocational Education) located at 3000 Boullé Street, Saint-Hyacinthe, Quebec, Canada. More than 4500 students attend the CEGEP to study in one of five pre-university general studies programs and eighteen vocational studies programs.  The CEGEP's twelve intercollegiate sport teams are called Lauréats.

General studies programs
 Arts et lettres (arts visuels et médiatiques)
 Arts et lettres (cinéma)
 Arts et lettres (exploration théâtrale)
 Arts et lettres (culture et création)
 Sciences de la nature
 Sciences de la nature (Sciences de la santé)
 Sciences de la nature (Sciences pures et appliquées)
 Sciences humaines
 Sciences humaines (administration)

Vocational programs
 Techniques de diététique
 Technique d'analyses biomédicales
 Techniques d'éducation à l'enfance
 Techniques d'hygiène dentaire
 Techniques de l'informatique de gestion
 Techniques de gestion de réseaux informatiques
 Techniques de l'informatique de gestion
 Techniques de laboratoire : spécialisation en biotechnologies
 Techniques de soins préhospitaliers d'urgences
 Conseil en assurances et en services financiers
 Technologie de la mécanique du bâtiment
 Techniques de santé animale
 Soins infirmiers
 Techniques de comptabilité et de gestion
 Gestion de commerces
 Théâtre - Interprétation théâtrale
 Théâtre - Production théâtrale

Gallery

References 

Saint-Hyacinthe
Educational institutions established in 1968
Buildings and structures in Saint-Hyacinthe
Education in Montérégie